Channel 14 or TV14 may refer to:

Canada
Television stations that broadcast on digital channel 14 (UHF frequencies covering 470-476 MHz):
 CIII-DT in Ottawa, Ontario
 CITS-DT in London, Ontario

Television stations that operate on virtual channel 14:
 CITS-DT in London, Ontario
 CJMT-DT in Ottawa, Ontario

Other uses

 TV-14, a rating for TV parental guidelines
 Vos TV (Canal 14), a Nicaraguan cable TV channel
 Paraguay TV, a government-owned Paraguayan TV station
 Canal Catorce (Channel 14), a Mexican public broadcaster
 Channel 14 (Israel)

See also
 Channel 14 TV stations in Mexico
 Channel 14 branded TV stations in the United States
 Channel 14 digital TV stations in the United States
 Channel 14 low-power TV stations in the United States
 Channel 14 virtual TV stations in the United States

14